Nigar Mirzaliyeva (born 28 April 2002) is an Azerbaijani footballer who plays as a defender for Women's Championship club Balxurma FK and the Azerbaijan women's national team.

See also
List of Azerbaijan women's international footballers

References

External links

2002 births
Living people
Women's association football defenders
Azerbaijani women's footballers
Azerbaijan women's international footballers